The 768th Bombardment Squadron is an inactive United States Air Force unit.  It was last assigned to the 462d Strategic Aerospace Wing at Larson Air Force Base, Washington, where it was inactivated on 25 June 1966.  The squadron was first activated in 1943, and became one of the earliest Boeing B-29 Superfortress units.  It moved to the China Burma India Theater in April 1944 and participated in the first attack on the Japanese Home Islands since the 1942 Doolittle Raid on 15 June 1944.  It earned three Distinguished Unit Citations.  The squadron moved to Tinian with the rest of the 58th Bombardment Wing in April 1945 and continued its participation in the strategic bombing campaign against Japan until V-J Day.  In November 1945, it returned to the United States, where it was inactivated in April 1946.

The squadron was reactivated in February 1963 as a Boeing B-52 Stratofortress squadron, absorbing the resources of another squadron that was simultaneously inactivated.  It stood alert with its bombers until becoming non-operational in April 1966.

History

World War II

Training in the United States
The squadron was first activated on 1 July 1943 at Smoky Hill Army Air Field, Kansas as one of the four original squadrons of the 462d Bombardment Group, and was intended to be one of the first units to fly the Boeing B-29 Superfortress.  However, no B-29s were available to equip the squadron.  However, no B-29s were available to equip the squadron.  It moved to Walker Army Air Field, Kansas at the end of the month.  Smoky Hill and Walker were two of four bases chosen for B-29 training based on their proximity to Boeing's factory at Wichita, Kansas, where most of the early Superfortresses would be produced.

At Walker, it received its initial cadre from elements of the 40th Bombardment Group and began to fly a mix of Martin B-26 Marauders and Boeing B-17 Flying Fortresses.  Delays in producing the B-29, labor disputes at the engine manufacturer,  and modifications to the planes to make them ready for combat resulted in belated deliveries to combat units and it was close to the end of 1943 before aircrews could train in the new bomber in any number.  Ground echelon personnel began shipping out in December 1943 to prepare the airfields for the bombers without completing their training in the United States.  The air echelon of the squadron trained with the B-29 at Walker until March 1944, when it departed for its first overseas base, Piardoba Airfield, Bengal, India, to participate in Operation Matterhorn, which called for B-29 attacks from advanced bases in China, while the bombers' main bases were in India.

Operations from India and China
The air echelon ferried its planes to India via Canada, across north Africa then to India.  Once all elements of the 462d Group had arrived at Piardoba in June, the squadron became part of Twentieth Air Force, which reported directly to Headquarters, Army Air Forces, bypassing theater command.  Initially, the squadron's bombers were used to airlift supplies over the Hump to forward bases in China, primarily to Chengtu.   It flew its first combat mission, an attack on rail targets in Bangkok, Thailand on 5 June 1944.

Ten days later, the squadron took part in the first attack on the Japanese Home Islands since the 1942 Doolittle Raid.  Attacks on Japan required staging through forward bases in China, and it took twelve flights by the bombers to transport enough fuel and munitions to the forward bases to prepare for one attack sortie.  This limited attacks on Japan to one in ten days. However, the squadron attacked iron plants, aircraft factories, naval installations, transportation centers and other targets in Japan.    The squadron moved its available aircraft to the forward base at Chiung-Lai Airfield.  Staging of B-29s, already armed and loaded with bombs began on 13 June and was only completed on the day of the raid, with only refueling needed at Chiung-Lai.  The primary target for this mission was the Imperial Steel Works at Yawata.

The squadron also attacked targets in Burma, China, Formosa and Indonesia.  In August 1944, operating from China Bay Airport in Ceylon (now Sri Lanka), where the Royal Air Force provided support for the mission, it mined the Musi River in Sumatra during Operation Boomerang, dropping down below a 1000-foot ceiling to sow the mines.  On 20 August, the squadron again attacked iron and steel works in Yawata, Japan in a daylight raid for which it earned its first Distinguished Unit Citation (DUC).  Fighter opposition on this attack included the first experience of a Japanese fighter plane intentionally ramming a B-29.

In October 1944, the 462d Bombardment Group was reorganized, along with other groups in XX Bomber Command.  The squadron's strength was increased by three B-29s made available by the inactivation of the 771st Bombardment Squadron and maintenance personnel from the disbanding maintenance squadrons of the 462d.  During its remaining time in the China-Burma-India Theater, the squadron found itself more frequently attacking tactical targets in Formosa and the Philippines to support of forces advancing in the Pacific.

Operations from the Marianas and return home
By the spring of 1945, Allied forces advancing in the Pacific had captured the Mariana Islands, and B-29 bases were being constructed there.  In April, the squadron moved to the new West Field (Tinian), which was nearer to Japan and would permit direct strikes on the Home Islands without staging through advanced bases.

From Tinian, the squadron participated in the strategic bombing campaign against Japan, conducting mining operations and making night attacks against urban areas.  Between 23 and 25 May 1945, it bombed industrial areas of Tokyo and Yokohama, for which it was awarded a second DUC.  It earned a third DUC for an attack on an aircraft manufacturing plant at Takarazuka on 25 July.

The squadron flew its last mission of the war on 14 August 1945.  Following V-J Day the squadron remained on Tinian until November 1945, when it moved to MacDill Field, Florida.  It was only partially staffed while there, and it was inactivated at MacDill on 31 March 1946, shortly after the formation of Strategic Air Command (SAC).

Strategic Air Command operations
In 1962, in order to perpetuate the lineage of inactive bombardment units with illustrious World War II records, SAC received authority from Headquarters USAF to discontinue its Major Command controlled strategic wings that were equipped with combat aircraft and to activate Air Force controlled units, which could carry a lineage and history, in their place.  As a result, the 462d Strategic Aerospace Wing replaced the 4170th Strategic Wing at Larson Air Force Base, Washington.   As part of this organizational action, the squadron took over the mission, personnel and equipment of the 327th Bombardment Squadron, which was simultaneously inactivated.  SAC wings were organized under the dual deputy system, so the squadron was assigned directly to the 462d Wing, rather than to a group.

One half of the squadron's Boeing B-52 Stratofortress aircraft were maintained on fifteen minute alert, fully fueled and ready for combat to reduce vulnerability to a Soviet missile strike. The squadron continued the mission of strategic bombardment training and participated in exercises and operational readiness inspections. However, "[i]n December 1965, . . . Robert S. McNamara, Secretary of Defense [announced] another phaseout program that would further reduce SAC's bomber force. The squadron became non-operational in April 1966, and was inactivated on 25 June 1966 in preparation for the closure of Larson.

Lineage
 Constituted as the 768th Bombardment Squadron (Heavy) on 19 May 1943
 Activated on 1 July 1943
 Redesignated 768th Bombardment Squadron, Very Heavy on 20 November 1943
 Inactivated on 31 March 1946
 Redesignated 768th Bombardment Squadron, Heavy and activated on 15 November 1962 (not organized)
 Organized on 1 February 1963
 Inactivated on 25 June 1966

Assignments
 462d Bombardment Group, 1 July 1943 – 31 March 1946
 Strategic Air Command, 15 November 1962 (not organized)
 462d Strategic Aerospace Wing, 1 February 1963 – 25 June 1966

Stations

 Smoky Hill Army Air Field, Kansas, 1 July 1943
 Walker Army Air Field, Kansas, 28 July 1943 – c. 12 March 1944
 Piardoba Airfield, Bengal, India, c. 16 April 1944 – April 1945

 West Field (Tinian), Mariana Islands, April–5 November 1945
 MacDill Field, Florida, November–31 March 1946
 Larson Air Force Base, Washington, 1 February 1963 – 25 June 1966

Aircraft

 Martin B-26 Marauder, 1943
 Boeing B-17 Flying Fortress, 1943–1944

 Boeing B-29 Superfortress, 1944–1946
 Boeing B-52 Stratofortress, 1963–1966

Awards and campaigns

See also

 List of B-52 Units of the United States Air Force
 List of B-29 Superfortress operators
 B-17 Flying Fortress units of the United States Army Air Forces
 List of Martin B-26 Marauder operators

References

Notes
 Explanatory notes

 Citations

Bibliography

 
 
 
 
 
 

Bombardment squadrons of the United States Air Force
Units and formations of Strategic Air Command
Strategic bombing squadrons of the United States Army Air Forces
Military units and formations established in 1943